Karlsdorf  was a village (a German colony) in the vicinity of Klymets, in what is now Stryi Raion, Lviv Oblast, of Western Ukraine.

The village was established around 1835 by Karl Scheiff, the heir of Smozhe. He invited Catholic German settlers from Western Bohemia, fueling the society of Galician Germans. In the same year two other nearby German colonies were established in the same way, Felizienthal and Annaberg, forming a small language island. Karlsdorf became a seat of the German-speaking Catholic parish in 1843, which was in 1863 moved to Felizienthal.

In the interwar period the village belonged to Poland.

Notes 

Ghost towns in Ukraine
Villages in Stryi Raion